Lake Doxa is an artificial lake in western Corinthia, Greece. It is situated at an elevation of 900 m, in the municipal unit Feneos, near the village Archaia Feneos. Construction was completed in the late 1990s. It is fed and drained by the small river Doxa (Δόξα), which empties into the plain of Feneos. In the heart of the lake on a small peninsula features a small church of Agios Fanourios. The Saint George Monastery in Feneos was relocated to higher ground, north of the lake. The lake is surrounded by pine forests.

Gallery

External links

Photos of Lake Doxa at TrekEarth
Photos of Lake Doxa on webshots

Landforms of Corinthia
Doxa
Landforms of Peloponnese (region)